The 1986 Malatya earthquake was a  6.1 earthquake that occurred in the early morning hours of May 5th, 1986. It registered a maximum Modified Mercalli Intensity of VIII (Severe). It occurred near the city of Malatya, Turkey.

Tectonic setting

Most of Turkey lies on the Anatolian Plate. Deformation from is accommodated through three main faults: the eastern portion of the Hellenic Trench accommodates convergence between the Aegean Sea Plate and the Anatolian Plate in the south, the North Anatolian Fault in the north accommodates the collision between the Arabian Plate and the Eurasian Plate which forces the Anatolian west, and the East Anatolian Fault in the east, on which this earthquake occurred, accommodates the same deformation.

Earthquake
The  6.1 earthquake struck near the city of Malatya, Turkey at 06:35 TRT on May 5th. The focal mechanism of the earthquake indicates strike slip faulting with a strike in agreement with rupture along the East Anatolian Fault. The amount of aftershocks that occurred were small, but a noteworthy  5.8 earthquake rocked the same area only a month later. The mainshock occurred along a section of the East Anatolian Fault which meets the Bitlis Thrust Zone. The left-lateral Sürgü Fault may have been associated with the event due to its proximity to the epicenter.

Damage
The mainshock killed 15 people and injured a hundred more. Dozens of houses were reportedly damaged. The worst hit town was Doğanşehir, where 13 people were killed and 100 houses collapsed. In the neighboring town of Gölbaşı, the quake took two more lives, destroyed the town's mosque, and caused schools to be closed. At the nearby Sürgü Dam, 10 kilometers to the northeast, very strong shaking caused cracks to appear in the dam. The largest of the cracks were up to 150 meters in length, 20 centimeters in width, and 3 meters deep. A strong aftershock on June 6 caused an additional fatality and four more injuries.

See also
List of earthquakes in 1986
List of earthquakes in Turkey

References

1986 earthquakes
Earthquakes in Turkey
1986 in Turkey
May 1986 events in Asia
History of Malatya
1986 disasters in Turkey